Midnight Rose was a name taken by a group of United Kingdom science fiction and fantasy writers for a series of shared world anthologies published by the Penguin Books imprint Roc. The group's "core members" were Alex Stewart, Roz Kaveney, Neil Gaiman and Mary Gentle. Contributors to individual anthologies included Marcus Rowland, Storm Constantine, Kim Newman, Charles Stross, Stephen Baxter, Colin Greenland, Graham Higgins, Paul Cornell and David Langford, among others.

The anthologies were:

Temps
Two volumes of superhero pastiches, set in a world where the United Kingdom and European Union demand registry of superhuman talents, whereupon the Talented are expected to be permanently "on call" as part-time superheroes, in exchange for a stipend. The popular perception of the British Civil Service is played up, with registering as a "Temp" being strangely similar to applying for Jobseeker's Allowance or other benefits. The two books were Temps (1991) and EuroTemps (1992).

The Weerde
The concept behind The Weerde was that shapeshifting creatures had been living alongside humanity for millennia, mostly concealing themselves, but occasionally giving rise to legends of supernatural monsters. The books in this series were The Weerde Book One (1992) and The Weerde Book Two: Book of the Ancients (1993).

Villains!
Villains! (1992) was a parody of heroic fantasy. Like Gentle's later Grunts, it looked at the typical fantasy world from the point of view of the villains.

Several of the stories from these anthologies have subsequently appeared in other collections, or have been put on line by their authors:

Roz Kaveney: "A Lonely Impulse" (Temps), "A Wolf To Man" (The Weerde Book One), "Bellringer's Overtime" (Villains!), "Totally Trashed" (EuroTemps), "Ignorance of Perfect Reason" (The Weerde Book Two)
David Langford: "Leaks" (Temps), "The Arts of the Enemy" (Villains!), "If Looks Could Kill" (EuroTemps), "The Lions in the Desert" (The Weerde Book Two)
Marcus Rowland: "Frog Day Afternoon" (Temps), "Playing Safe" (EuroTemps), "The Missing Martian" (The Weerde Book Two)
Charles Stross: "Examination Night" (Villains!), "Ancient Of Days" (The Weerde Book One), "Red, Hot and Dark" (The Weerde Book Two)

External links 
 Roz Kaveney: stories online
 David Langford: bibliography
 Marcus Rowland: stories online
 Charles Stross: stories online

Science fiction organizations